New World Press (NWP) is a Beijing-based Chinese publishing house. New World Press has published more than 5000 titles, publishing exclusively in foreign languages including English before 1997, and exclusively in Chinese after 2002. 

New World Press was established in 1966 as a subsidiary of Foreign Languages Press (FLP), and became independent from FLP in 1986, though both were owned by China International Publishing Group (CIPG). In 2001, a major decision by CIPG resulted in some publishers like Chinese Literature Press merging with NWP, and NWP published only Chinese books thereafter.

References

 铁算盘-新世界出版社的“铁算盘”

External links
 nwp.com.cn Chinese official site
New World Press Archived version (2011) of official NWS site.

Publishing companies of China